Nasirabad (also Romanized as Naşīrābād; also known as Nāserābād) is a village in Gandoman Rural District, Gandoman District, Borujen County, Chaharmahal and Bakhtiari Province, Iran. At the 2006 census, its population was 511, in 113 families. The village is populated by Lurs.

References 

Populated places in Borujen County
Luri settlements in Chaharmahal and Bakhtiari Province